Carlos Uriel Merancio-Valdez (born 14 September 1998) is a Mexican professional footballer who plays as a goalkeeper for USL Championship club Rio Grande Valley FC.

Career
Merancio played with the youth team of Monarcas Morelia, appearing for their second-team Monarcas Morelia Premier in 2018.

Merancio joined FC Tucson ahead of their inaugural season in the new USL League One.

On 11 January 2021, Merancio joined USL Championship side Hartford Athletic.

Merancio rejoined FC Tucson for the 2022 season on December 20, 2021. Carlos is also the goalkeeper coach for Arizona Mens Soccer, the soccer team at the University of Arizona. Carlos has his own goalkeeper academy in Tucson called "Tophand goalkeeping academy".

On 3 February 2023, Merancio signed with USL Championship side Rio Grande Valley FC.

References

External links

1998 births
Living people
Association football goalkeepers
Expatriate soccer players in the United States
FC Tucson players
Hartford Athletic players
Mexican expatriate footballers
Mexican footballers
USL League One players
Mexican expatriate sportspeople in the United States
Sportspeople from Hermosillo
Rio Grande Valley FC Toros players